The Women's Freestyle 53 kg is a competition featured at the 2021 European Wrestling Championships, and was held in Warsaw, Poland on April 22 and April 23.

Medalists

Results 
 Legend
 F — Won by fall

Main Bracket

Repechage

References

External links
Draw

Women's Freestyle 53 kg
2021 in women's sport wrestling